Adrián Domenech (born 25 March 1959) is a retired Argentine football defender and former coach of Argentinos Juniors.

Playing career

Adrián Domenech began his career playing for Argentinos Juniors in 1978. In 1980, he joined Club Atlético Independiente but he returned to Argentinos in 1982.

His second spell with Argentinos was a period of unprecedented success, with two league titles, the Copa Libertadores 1985 title and the Copa Interamericana title. During his time at Argentinos Domenech played 245 games in all competitions, scoring 7 goals.

After leaving Argentinos Domenech had short spells with Boca Juniors, Genclerbirligi in Turkey and with Platense, where he retired in 1991.

Titles

References

External links
 Managerial stats in the Argentine Primera
 Statistics at BDFA 

Living people
1959 births
Footballers from Buenos Aires
Association football defenders
Argentine footballers
Argentinos Juniors footballers
Boca Juniors footballers
Gençlerbirliği S.K. footballers
Club Atlético Platense footballers
Argentine Primera División players
Süper Lig players
Argentine expatriate footballers
Expatriate footballers in Turkey
Argentine football managers
Argentinos Juniors managers